Makran Division (Baloch: مکران) is an administrative division of Balochistan Province, Pakistan. It is the eastern component of the larger Makran region shared between Pakistan and Iran, located in southern Balochistan along the Gulf of Oman coast.

History 
Previously, Makran was a state. In 3 October 1952 Makran join Pakistan and with some states also merged to form Balochistan state union.

In 14 October 1955, After dissolution of Balochistan state union Makran get the status of district of Kalat division.

In 1958, Gwadar town Brought from Oman, include Makran District and create a tehsil.

On 1 July 1970, Makran create a division of Balochistan Province by bifurcation of Kalat division and three tehsils of Makran district Turbat, Panjgur and Gwadar upgraded to district level.

Districts 
It contains the following districts:

Gwadar District
Kech District
Panjgur District

Demographics 
According to 2017 census, Makran division had a population of 1,484,788, which includes 800,373 males and 694,274 females. 
Makran division constitutes 1,481,542 Muslims, 1459 scheduled castes, 572 Christians,  718 Hindus followed 497 others.

See also
 Divisions of Pakistan
 Makran

References

Divisions of Balochistan